A flipped image or reversed image, the more formal term, is a static or moving image that is generated by a mirror-reversal of an original across a horizontal axis (a flopped image is mirrored across the vertical axis).  Many printmaking techniques produce images where the printed copy is reversed from the image made on the printing plate, so in a print copying another image, or a real scene or object, unless the artist deliberately creates the plate as a mirror-image of his subject, the finished print will be a mirror image of it.  Many print makers developed the skill of reversing images when making printing plates, but many prints, especially early ones, have images that are reversed.

Photography
Many large format cameras present the image of the scene being photographed as a flipped image through their viewfinders. Some photographers regard this as a beneficial feature, as the unfamiliarity of the format allows them to compose the elements of the picture properly without being distracted by the actual contents of the scene. The technique is meant to bypass or override the brain's visual processing which normally sees what is expected rather than what is there.

Flipping is occasionally used as a trompe-l'œil effect in scenes which incorporate reflections in a body of water.  The image is deliberately inverted so that people slowly discern that something is 'not quite right' with the picture, and come to notice that it is upside down.

References

Artistic techniques
Graphics
Printmaking
Photographic techniques